Weststar Defence Industries Sdn Bhd  also known as Weststar is a Malaysian defence contractor involved in the development, manufacture and distribution of military and law enforcement vehicles, as well as providing consultancy services. 

Through its subsidiary Global Komited, it plays an important role in supplying military equipment to Malaysian Armed Forces.

History

It was established in 2003 as a Ford vehicle dealership before it moved to the defense industry in 2007.

On 6 March 2012, the Malaysian Defense Ministry announced that Weststar would supply the Malaysian Armed Forces with the General Service (GS) cargo pickup trucks. 11 GS trucks were supplied in 2012.

On 16 April 2014, a contract was signed with Thales in order to promote various air defense systems to the Malaysian Armed Forces.

On 10 June 2014, Weststar was awarded a contract to supply the Timor Leste Defence Force with GS trucks. 10 vehicles were to be delivered before the end of the year, and the company claimed that another 40 were to be ordered. The contract was priced at RM11 million (£2 million).

During the Defence & Security Exhibition 2015 convention, Thales which partnered with Weststar subsidiary, Global Komited announced that it had signed a contract to supply the Malaysian Armed Forces with ForceSHIELD to serve as its anti-air defense system. This included Starstreak missiles, Control Master 200 radar and weapon coordination systems, and Rapid Ranger and Rapid Rover mobile weapon systems.

On 20 April 2016, Weststar received a contract from the Malaysian Armed Forces to equip them with 44 Weststar GK-M1 Rapid Rover vehicles. An additional 44 were also expected to be ordered. They would be installed with the Starstreak very short-range air defence (VSHORAD) missile on a Lightweight Multiple Launcher (LML) system. Prototypes were tested after the contract was announced.

At the DSA 2016 exhibition, Weststar unveiled the Special Operations Vehicle (SOV) to visitors to showcase it to potential customers.

Products
Source:
Ambulance
Firefighting vehicle
 Weststar GS Cargo
Weststar SOV
Weststar GK-M1

References 

2003 establishments in Malaysia
Military vehicle manufacturers
Defense companies of Malaysia
Privately held companies of Malaysia
Malaysian brands